Christopher Richard O'Neal (born April 4, 1994) is an American actor. He is known for his role in the 2012 Nickelodeon television series How to Rock.

Early life
O'Neal, a resident of Teaneck, New Jersey, attended Teaneck High School, and previously attended Teaneck Community Charter School. He appeared in several commercials and in a Saturday Night Live skit before getting his first recurring role.

Career
O'Neal's first major role was in the 2012 Nickelodeon comedy series How to Rock,  playing the role of Kevin Reed, a high school freshman who is the drummer for the band Gravity 5. The same year he also co-hosted the Nickelodeon series, You Gotta See This, with Noah Crawford.

In 2013 O'Neal had a starring role in the 2013 Nickelodeon television film Swindle. In 2016 he was cast in a starring role on the 2017 Netflix drama series Greenhouse Academy.

In 2014 O'Neal released his EP Just getting started.

Filmography

References

External links

1994 births
Living people
Male actors from New Jersey
Place of birth missing (living people)
American male television actors
Teaneck High School alumni